Italy took part in the Junior Eurovision Song Contest 2021 in Paris, France, returning to the competition after a one year absence from the . Italian broadcaster RAI is responsible for the country's participation in the contest. Elisabetta Lizza represented Italy with the song " (Mirror on the Wall)".

Background

On the country's most recent appearance, in 2019, the Italian broadcaster internally selected Marta Viola to represent Italy at the contest with the song "". She achieved seventh place with 129 points.

Italy withdrew from the 2020 contest due to the COVID-19 pandemic, and despite initially announcing that they would not return in 2021, they ultimately announced their participation in the 2021 contest in France.

Before Junior Eurovision 
Upon announcing their return, Italian broadcaster RAI declared that they would internally select the Italian entrant. On 11 November 2021, it was announced that Elisabetta Lizza would be representing Italy at the contest with the rock song " (Mirror on the Wall)". The song, released on 12 November, was written by Fabrizio Palaferri, Stefano Rigamonti, Marco Iardella and Franco Fasano.

At Junior Eurovision
After the opening ceremony, which took place on 13 December 2021, it was announced that Italy would perform fifth on 19 December 2021, following Malta and preceding Bulgaria.

At the end of the contest, Italy received 107 points, placing 10th out of 19 participating countries.

Voting

Detailed voting results

References 

Italy
Junior
Junior Eurovision Song Contest